A turbo-compound engine is a reciprocating engine that employs a turbine to recover energy from the exhaust gases. Instead of using that energy to drive a turbocharger as found in many high-power aircraft engines, the energy is instead sent to the output shaft to increase the total power delivered by the engine. The turbine is usually mechanically connected to the crankshaft, as on the Wright R-3350 Duplex-Cyclone, but electric and hydraulic power recovery systems have been investigated as well.

As this recovery process does not increase fuel consumption, it has the effect of reducing the specific fuel consumption, the ratio of fuel use to power. Turbo-compounding was used for commercial airliners and similar long-range, long-endurance roles before the introduction of turbojet engines. Examples using the Duplex-Cyclone include the Douglas DC-7B and Lockheed L-1049 Super Constellation, while other designs did not see production use.

Concept

Most piston engines have a hot exhaust that still contains considerable undeveloped energy that could be used for propulsion if extracted. A turbine is often used to extract energy from such a stream of gases. A conventional gas turbine is fed high-pressure, high-velocity air, extracts energy from it, and leaves as a lower-pressure, slower-moving stream. This action has the side-effect of increasing the upstream pressure, which makes it undesirable for use with a piston engine as it increases the back-pressure in the engine, which decreases scavenging of the exhaust gas from the cylinders and thereby lowers the efficiency of the piston portion of a compound engine.

Through the late 1930s and early 1940s one solution to this problem was the introduction of "jet stack" exhaust manifolds. These were simply short sections of metal pipe attached to the exhaust ports, shaped so that they would interact with the airstream to produce a jet of air that produced forward thrust. Another World War II introduction was the use of the Meredith effect to recover heat from the radiator system to provide additional thrust.

By the late-war era, turbine development had improved dramatically and led to a new turbine design known as the "blowdown turbine" or "power-recovery turbine". This design extracts energy from the momentum of the moving exhaust, but does not appreciably increase back-pressure. This means it does not have the undesirable effects of conventional designs when connected to the exhaust of a piston engine, and a number of manufacturers began studying the design.

History

The first aircraft engine to be tested with a power-recovery turbine was the Rolls-Royce Crecy. This was used primarily to drive a geared centrifugal supercharger, although it was also coupled to the crankshaft and gave an extra 15 to 35 percent fuel economy.

Blowdown turbines became relatively common features in the late- and post-war era, especially for engines designed for long overwater flights. Turbo-compounding was used on several airplane engines after World War II, including the Napier Nomad and the Wright R-3350. In the case of the R-3350, maintenance crews sometimes nicknamed the turbine the parts recovery turbine due to its negative effect on engine reliability. Turbo-compound versions of the Napier Deltic, Rolls-Royce Crecy, Rolls-Royce Griffon, and Allison V-1710 were constructed but none was developed beyond the prototype stage. It was realized in many cases the power produced by the simple turbine was approaching that of the enormously complex and maintenance-intensive piston engine to which it was attached. As a result, turbo-compound aero engines were soon supplanted by turboprop and turbojet engines.

Some modern heavy truck diesel manufacturers have incorporated turbo-compounding into their designs. Examples include the Detroit Diesel DD15 and Scania in production from 1991.

Starting with the 2014 season, Formula 1 switched to a new 1.6 liter turbocharged V6 formula that uses turbo-compounding. The engines use a single turbocharger that is connected to an electric motor/generator called the MGU-H. The MGU-H uses a turbine to drive a generator, converting waste heat from the exhaust into electrical energy that is either stored in a battery or sent directly to an electric motor in the car's powertrain.

List of types

 Detroit Diesel
 DD15

 Napier
 Napier Nomad
 Wright Aeronautical
 Wright R-3350: The turbo-compound version was the only turbo-compound aero-engine to see mass production and widespread usage.
 Dobrynin
 Dobrynin VD-4K
 Zvezda
 Zvezda M503: Soviet-built 42 cylinder diesel naval engine used in the Osa-class missile boat
 Renault
 Renault Energy F1: 1.6 liter turbocharged V6 engine built for Formula 1. Unlike its contemporaries, still uses a wastegate as an emergency measure to control boost pressure in case the turbo-compounding with the MGU-H fails.
 Ferrari
 Ferrari 059: 1.6 liter turbocharged V6 engine built for Formula 1 for the Ferrari F14 T as well as the Sauber C33.
 Mercedes-Benz
 Mercedes PU106: 1.6 liter turbocharged V6 engine built for Mercedes-Benz Formula 1 programme.
 Honda
 Honda RA615H: 1.6 liter turbocharged V6 engine built for Formula 1 for the McLaren MP4-30.

See also
 Motorjet
 Turbosteamer
 Cogeneration
 Turbocharger
 Gas turbine
 Electric turbo-compound

References

Turbo-compound engines
Turbochargers
Engine technology
Internal combustion engine
Piston engines